The 2008 congressional elections in Kansas were held on November 4, 2008 to determine who would represent the state of Kansas in the United States House of Representatives, coinciding with the presidential and senatorial elections. Representatives are elected for two-year terms; those elected will serve in the 111th Congress from January 3, 2009 until January 3, 2011.

Kansas has four seats in the House, apportioned according to the 2000 United States Census. Its 2007-2008 congressional delegation consisted of two Republicans and two Democrats. It is now three Republicans and one Democrat. District 2 was the only seat which changed party (from Democratic to Republican), although CQ Politics had forecasted districts 2 and 3 to be at some risk for the incumbent party.
The primary elections for Republican Party and Democratic Party candidates were held on August 5.<ref>2008 Election Calendar Kansas Secretary of State'''</ref>

Overview

District 1

Incumbent Republican Jerry Moran won re-election, defeating Democratic nominee James Bordonaro and independents Kathleen Burton and Jack Warner. CQ Politics forecasted the race as 'Safe Republican'.

District 2

Republican nominee and former Kansas State Treasurer Lynn Jenkins won against Democratic incumbent Nancy Boyda, Libertarian Robert Garrard, and Reform Party candidate Leslie Martin. CQ Politics forecasted the race as 'No Clear Favorite'.

District 3

Incumbent Democrat Dennis Moore won against Republican nominee and Kansas State Senator Nick Jordan, Libertarian candidate Joe Bellis, and Reform candidate Roger Tucker. CQ Politics forecasted the race as 'Democrat Favored'.

District 4

Incumbent Republican Todd Tiahrt won against Democratic nominee and Kansas State Senator Donald Betts, Jr., Libertarian candidate Steven Rosile and Reform Party candidate Susan G. Ducey in the General election. CQ Politics forecasted the race as 'Safe Republican'.

References

External links
 Elections & Legislative from the Kansas Secretary of State U.S. Congress candidates for Kansas at Project Vote Smart
 Campaign contributions for Kansas congressional races from OpenSecrets
 Kansas U.S. House of Representatives race from 2008 Race Tracker''

2008
Kansas
United States House of Representatives